Chaetagonum collarti is a species of beetle in the family Carabidae, the only species in the genus Chaetagonum.

References

Platyninae